is a Tokyo-based operating unit of Kirin, primarily engaged in the production and retail of wine and other alcoholic beverages.

Chateau Mercian, produced and sold in Japan, is one of the most widely available brands of Japanese wine.  Mercian Corporation also markets imported wine such as Casillero del Diablo, Frontera, and Sunrise brands in partnership with Concha y Toro, a leading Chilean wine producer.

Mercian has domestic wine production facilities in Kanagawa, Yamanashi and Kumamoto prefectures.

See also
 Japanese Wine

References 

Companies formerly listed on the Tokyo Stock Exchange
Food and drink companies based in Tokyo
Retail companies based in Tokyo
Wineries of Japan
1934 establishments in Japan
Kirin Group
2010 mergers and acquisitions